Elections for the United States House of Representatives for the 2nd Congress were held in Massachusetts beginning October 4, 1790, with subsequent elections held in four districts due to a majority not being achieved on the first ballot.

Background 
In the previous election, 6 Pro-Administration and 2 Anti-Administration Representatives had been elected.  One representative, George Partridge (P) of the  resigned August 14, 1790.  His seat was vacant at the time of the 1790 elections, so that there were 5 Pro-Administration and 2 Anti-Administration incumbents, all of whom ran for re-election.

Three candidates ran in districts with different numbers from the previous election. It is not clear from the source used whether there was redistricting or if the districts had simply been renumbered.

Massachusetts law at the time required a majority for election. In the remaining four districts additional elections were required.

First Ballot 
The first ballot was held on October 4, 1790.

Second ballot 
A majority was achieved in the 5th and 7th districts on the second ballot

Third ballot 
Neither district achieved a majority on this ballot.

Fourth ballot 
A majority was achieved in the 8th district.

Fifth ballot 
A majority was not achieved. This was the last ballot before the first session of the 2nd Congress began on October 24, 1791. The 6th district was still vacant at the start of the 1st session.

Sixth ballot 
A majority was not achieved.

Seventh ballot 
A majority was not achieved.

Eighth ballot 

Ninth ballot 

Notes

See also 
 1790 and 1791 United States House of Representatives elections

References 
 Electoral data are from Ourcampaigns.com

1790
Massachusetts
Massachusetts
Massachusetts
United States House of Representatives
United States House of Representatives
United States House of Representatives